Tasman Seamounts may refer to:

Tasmanian Seamounts
Tasmantid Seamount Chain